Elena Ethel "Elly" Schlein (born 4 May 1985) is an Italian politician and the secretary of the Democratic Party (PD) since 12 March 2023. She is a member of Italy's Chamber of Deputies and was previously the vice-president of Emilia-Romagna and a member of the European Parliament. On 26 February 2023, she was elected as the new secretary of the PD in an upset.

Early life and education 
Elena Ethel Schlein was born on 4 May 1985 in Lugano, Switzerland. Her father, Melvin Schlein, is an American academic and political scientist of Ashkenazi Jewish descent. Her mother, Maria Paola Viviani, is a professor of comparative public law at the University of Insubria. Originally, her paternal grandfather's surname was Schleyen; after arriving at Ellis Island, he changed it to Schlein. Her maternal grandfather was the Italian Socialist Party politician , senator from 1972 to 1979 and a member of the High Council of the Judiciary. Her paternal ancestors were from Zhovkva, now located in Ukraine and her paternal grandmother, whom she takes the middle name "Ethel", was of Lithuanian origin. She has a sister who is a diplomat by profession and a brother who is a mathematician.

Later in her life, Schlein moved to Bologna. She graduated in law at the University of Bologna in 2011, discussing a thesis on constitutional law. Schlein holds American, Italian and Swiss citizenships.

Political career

Early beginnings, 2008–2013 
In 2008 and 2012, Schlein volunteered on Barack Obama's two presidential campaigns in the United States. In 2011, she was one of the founders of the association of university students known as Progrè, an association that dealt with deepening and sensitising public opinion on issues related to migration policies and the prison reality.

In April 2013, Romano Prodi, former Prime Minister of Italy and president of the Democratic Party (PD), received in support less than 100 centre-left coalition electors and left the 2013 Italian presidential election campaign. In response, Schlein gave life to the mobilisation campaign known as #OccupyPD, which criticised those behind Prodi's loss and opposed the formation of a grand coalition government, the Letta Cabinet. In occasion of the 2013 PD leadership election on 8 December, Schlein gave her support to Giuseppe Civati, who ranked third.

Member of the European Parliament, 2014–2019 
In February 2014, Schlein ran with the PD for a seat at the European Parliament in the North-Eastern constituency. In the 2014 European Parliament election in Italy, she was elected to the European Parliament. She served on the European Parliament Committee on Development. In addition to her committee assignments, she was part of the parliament's delegation to the European Union–Albania Stabilisation and Association Parliamentary Committee.

In May 2015, Schlein announced through a post on Facebook that she was leaving the PD, being in deep disagreement with the new political line of the party impressed by the party secretary and Italy's prime minister Matteo Renzi, and joined Possible, the party founded by Civati. In April 2019, Schlein announced her intention not to run in the 2019 European Parliament election in Italy.

Vice-president of Emilia-Romagna, 2020–2022 
In the 2020 Emilia-Romagna regional election on 26 January, Schlein ran as a candidate for member of the regional council of Emilia-Romagna as part of a left-wing electoral alliance called Emilia-Romagna Courageous Ecologist and Progressive. She was elected by achieving over 22,000 votes, being the most voted councillor in regional history, and was subsequently appointed by Stefano Bonaccini as his vice-president. In February 2020, the PD's secretary Nicola Zingaretti offered Schlein the party presidency spot left vacant by Paolo Gentiloni.

2022 general election and Democratic Party leadership run 
On 26 September, Schlein was a candidate in the 2022 Italian general election, being subsequently elected in the country's Chamber of Deputies. A few weeks later, following Letta's resignations as leader of the PD, Schlein announced her run for the 2023 PD leadership election. In an upset, for the first time in the party's leadership elections, Schlein overcame the second place of the closed primary, by winning the open primary on 26 February 2023, when she was successfully elected ahead of Stefano Bonaccini. In doing so, she became the PD's first female, as well as the youngest person, to be elected leader of the PD since the formation of the party in 2007. She is also the first publicly-declared LGBTQ secretary of the Italian center-left leading party. During her rise in the party, she has been compared to American congresswoman Alexandria Ocasio-Cortez. She succeeded Letta on 12 March 2023.

Personal life 
In February 2020, Schlein came out as bisexual. She describes herself as a feminist and a progressive. In December 2022, arsonists destroyed a car used by her sister, Susanna Schlein, a career diplomat serving in Athens, prompting Italy's incumbent prime minister Giorgia Meloni to express her "profound concern".

References

Further reading

External links 
 Files about her parliamentary activities in the European Parliament (in Italian) VIII legislature

1985 births
Living people
LGBT legislators in Italy
Bisexual women
People from Lugano
Democratic Party (Italy) politicians
Possible (Italy) politicians
21st-century Italian politicians
University of Bologna alumni
Deputies of Legislature XIX of Italy
Italian Ashkenazi Jews
MEPs for Italy 2014–2019
Democratic Party (Italy) MEPs
Italian people of Ukrainian-Jewish descent
Swiss emigrants to Italy